Birmingham League may mean:
Birmingham and District Premier League, a cricket competition
West Midlands (Regional) League, an association football competition previously known as the Birmingham and District League
Birmingham and District Invitation Cross Country League, a cross-country running competition